First Born is the debut studio album by American rock band The Plot in You. It was produced, composed, and completely played by the band's vocalist, Landon Tewers and was released through Rise Records on April 18, 2011. The album is a concept album based on the story of a boy and the problems he goes through in life; facing an abusive father among other challenges such as bereavement, abandonment, bullying, and anguish. The album "starts at the birth", and ends where he finally escapes his broken home permanently.

The album peaked at No. 36 on the Top Heatseekers chart close to a month after its release.

Track listing

Personnel
Credits adapted from Discogs.

The Plot in You

 Landon Tewers – vocals, guitars, bass, engineering, mixing, mastering, production
 Cole Worden – drums

Additional personnel
 Alex Wade and Shawn Carrano – management
 Cody Delong – booking
 Dan Mumford – artwork, cover illustration
 Matt Day – photography
 Rise Records – layout

Charts

References

2011 debut albums
Rise Records albums
The Plot in You albums
Concept albums